Víctor Marcelo Torres Jeldes (born 11 October 1975) is a Chilean politician and physician, who served as member of the Chamber of Deputies of Chile. 

From 2022, he serves as Health Superintendent, position where was appointed by President Gabriel Boric.

References

External links
 
 BCN Profile

1975 births
Living people
21st-century Chilean politicians
University of Valparaíso alumni
Andrés Bello National University alumni
Christian Democratic Party (Chile) politicians
People from Valparaíso